KZMX (580 AM) is a radio station licensed to Hot Springs, South Dakota, United States, the station is owned by Mt. Rushmore Broadcasting, Inc.

History
On May 18, 2012, the Federal Communications Commission fined KZMX AM and its sister station, KZMX-FM, a combined $21,500 fine for various violations, including operation of the stations without any staff present, and inability to reach the station's staff.

The station along with others owned by Mt. Rushmore Broadcasting filed for an extension of the special temporary authority in early 2015, due to staffing issues. It was reported that staff had unexpectedly resigned, and there was difficulty finding new employees.

In late 2016, the station returned to the air from its licensed facility, but on exciter power which is significantly less than the licensed effective radiated power. It was reported to be running a classic rock format, however has stunted with CCM in summer 2020.

References

External links

Classic rock radio stations in the United States
ZMX